Kenndal McArdle (born January 4, 1987) is a Canadian former professional ice hockey left winger who played with the Florida Panthers and the Winnipeg Jets in the National Hockey League (NHL).

Playing career
As a youth, McArdle played in the 2001 Quebec International Pee-Wee Hockey Tournament with a minor ice hockey team from Burnaby.

McArdle began his major junior career playing for the Moose Jaw Warriors of the Western Hockey League (WHL). He recorded his most prolific WHL season in 2004–05 with 37 goals and 74 points. In the off-season, he was drafted in the first round, 20th overall, in the 2005 NHL Entry Draft by the Florida Panthers.

Returning to the WHL, McArdle was traded to the Vancouver Giants in early December 2006. Later that month, he was named to Team Canada for the 2007 World Junior Championships, where he earned gold. He completed the 2006–07 season helping the Giants to the 2007 Memorial Cup championship as the host city.

Graduating from junior, McArdle was assigned by Florida to the Rochester Americans of the American Hockey League (AHL), where he scored 10 points in 36 games in his professional rookie season. He completed the 2007-08 season in the ECHL playing in six games, and scoring four points (three goals and one assist), for the Florida Everblades. McArdle also played in three Kelly Cup Playoff games.

The following season, in 2008–09, McArdle improved to 24 points in 58 games with the Americans. He also appeared in three NHL games. He made his NHL debut on December 2, 2008, skating a total of 5:26 of ice times in their 5–3 win at the Washington Capitals.

During his final year of his entry-level contract on January 23, 2010, McArdle scored his first NHL goal for the Panthers against Jonas Gustavsson of the Toronto Maple Leafs.

On July 8, 2011, McArdle was traded to the Winnipeg Jets in exchange for Angelo Esposito. McArdle made the opening night roster for the inaugural season of the Jets in the 2011–12 season. After he was kept scoreless in nine games with the Jets, he was reassigned to AHL affiliate, the St. John's IceCaps on November 18, 2011. McArdle contributed with 7 goals in 35 games with the IceCaps before he was again on the move, reassigned in an AHL trade to the Portland Pirates for the remainder of the season on March 2, 2012.

Without a contract offer from the Jets and with the uncertainty of the 2012–13 NHL lockout, McArdle was invited to an AHL try-out at the Norfolk Admirals training camp for the 2012–13 season. Failing to make the Calder Cup reigning Admirals, he was released from his try-out and on October 28, 2012, was signed to a one-year contract with the Greenville Road Warriors of the ECHL, marking his first return to the league since 2008. On January 24, 2013, the Chicago Blackhawks announced he had signed to an AHL contract with their affiliate, the Rockford IceHogs, for the remainder of the season.

On May 13, 2013, McArdle signed his first European contract in agreeing to a one-year deal with VIK Västerås HK of the Swedish HockeyAllsvenskan. After a successful season with Västerås, McArdle initially joined Malmö Redhawks on an optional two-year contract, but on July 31, 2014, he terminated his contract and opted to retire from professional hockey after securing an investment banking job in Vancouver.

Awards
Won a gold medal with Team Canada at the World Junior Championships in 2007.
Won the Memorial Cup with the Vancouver Giants as CHL champions in 2007.

Personal life
Born in Canada, McArdle is of Trinidadian descent.

Career statistics

Regular season and playoffs

International

References

External links

Hockey's Future Profile

1987 births
Living people
Black Canadian ice hockey players
Canadian ice hockey left wingers
Canadian sportspeople of Trinidad and Tobago descent
Florida Everblades players
Florida Panthers draft picks
Florida Panthers players
Greenville Road Warriors players
Ice hockey people from Toronto
Malmö Redhawks players
Moose Jaw Warriors players
National Hockey League first-round draft picks
Portland Pirates players
Rochester Americans players
Rockford IceHogs (AHL) players
St. John's IceCaps players
Vancouver Giants players
VIK Västerås HK players
Winnipeg Jets players
Canadian expatriate ice hockey players in Sweden